Aleksanteri Toivola (4 March 1893 – 27 August 1987) was a Finnish wrestler and Olympic medalist in Greco-Roman wrestling.

Olympics
Toivola competed at the 1924 Summer Olympics in Paris where he won a silver medal in Greco-Roman wrestling, the featherweight class.

References

External links
 

1893 births
1987 deaths
Olympic wrestlers of Finland
Wrestlers at the 1924 Summer Olympics
Wrestlers at the 1928 Summer Olympics
Finnish male sport wrestlers
Olympic silver medalists for Finland
Olympic medalists in wrestling
Medalists at the 1924 Summer Olympics
19th-century Finnish people
20th-century Finnish people